The Government of Canada has established at least 316 reserves for First Nation band governments in its westernmost province of British Columbia. The majority of these reserves continue to exist while a number are no longer in existence.

See also
List of First Nations in British Columbia
List of Indian reserves in Canada

References

 
Indian Reserves
Indian, B.C.